Eurhynchinae is a subfamily of beetles belonging to the family Brentidae.

Genera 
Genera accepted within the subfamily:

 Aporhina Boisduval, 1835
 Ctenaphydes Pascoe, 1870
 Eurhynchus Kirby, 1828
 Orapaeus Kuschel and Oberprieler in Kuschel, Oberprieler and Rayner, 1994

References 

Brentidae
Beetles described in 1863